Agustín Leonardo was a Spanish painter of the Baroque period.

He was born in Valencia, and took up the habit of the Order of Mercy at Xàtiva. In 1620 he was a brother in the convent of that order at Puig near Valencia, where he painted for the sacristy four large canvases: Finding the Image of Our Lady at Puig, Siege and Surrender of Valencia to King James; and the Battle of the Puig in which St. George fought with Christians. He afterwards visited Seville, where he painted a Christ and the Samarian Woman (1624). In 1624-5 he was called to Madrid, where he painted two pictures for the great staircase of the Convent of Mercy. He excelled in portraiture, and painted a portrait of Gabriel Bocangel, the poet. The date and place of his death is uncertain.

References

Year of birth missing
Year of death missing
People from Valencia
Spanish Baroque painters
17th-century Spanish painters
Spanish male painters